Liliana D'Ambrosio (born 30 July 1964, in Melbourne) is an Australian politician. She has been a Labor Party member of the Victorian Legislative Assembly since 2002, representing the electorate of Mill Park. She is presently Minister for Energy, Environment and Climate Change and Minister for Solar Homes in the Andrews Ministry. 

She was educated at Mercy College, Coburg and St Aloysius' College, North Melbourne. She received an Arts degree from the University of Melbourne in 1986 and later a Diploma in Public Policy.

Political career
D'Ambrosio joined the Labor Party at university, and subsequently became an organiser with the Australian Services Union in 1986. She was promoted to state organiser in 1994, and served in the position until 1999, when she became an electorate officer to Alex Andrianopoulos, the then-Speaker of the Victorian Legislative Assembly. He retired in 2002, and she replaced him as the party's candidate in his safe seat of Mill Park.

In 2010, D'Ambrosio joined John Brumby's cabinet when she was appointed Minister for Community Development after a cabinet reshuffle following the resignation of Lynne Kosky.

D'Ambrosio is a member of the Socialist Left.

Personal life
D'Ambrosio is a member of Labor women's network Emily's List and the Union of Australian Women. She is married, with two daughters, Eleanor and Maddy.

D'Ambrosio lives in Brunswick, located approximately 17km from her electorate of Mill Park.

References

External links
 Parliamentary voting record of Lily D'Ambrosio at Victorian Parliament Tracker

1964 births
Living people
Labor Left politicians
Australian Labor Party members of the Parliament of Victoria
Members of the Victorian Legislative Assembly
Victorian Ministers for the Environment
University of Melbourne alumni
University of Melbourne women
Australian politicians of Italian descent
Women members of the Victorian Legislative Assembly
21st-century Australian politicians
21st-century Australian women politicians
Politicians from Melbourne